"False Alarm" is a song by the Los Angeles-based punk rock band The Bronx, released as the second single from their 2003 debut album The Bronx. It was their second single to chart, reaching #73 on the UK Singles Chart.

The song is on the soundtrack for Rock Band 3.

While the album was released by Ferret Music and the band's own label White Drugs, the singles for all of their albums have been released exclusively in the United Kingdom, through Wichita Recordings. The single was released on both compact disc and 7-inch vinyl, the latter pressed on translucent green vinyl and limited to 1,500 copies. The B-side song is a cover version of Neil Young's "The Needle and the Damage Done". The cover artwork was designed by guitarist Joby J. Ford.

The music video for "False Alarm" was directed by Mike Piscitelli. The black-and-white video consists of footage from old B-grade horror, science fiction, and thriller films. The band members, performing in white face makeup with heavy dark eye shadow, are composited into the scenes.

Track listing

CD version

Vinyl version

Personnel

Band
 Matt Caughthran – lead vocals
 Joby J. Ford – guitar, artwork and design
 James Tweedy – bass guitar
 Jorma Vik – drums

Production
 Gilby Clarke – producer, recording
 Howie Weinberg – mastering

See also
The Bronx discography

References

The Bronx (band) songs
2004 singles
2003 songs